Mount Zion is a small mountain chain in the Central New York region of New York. It is located southwest of Otego, New York. It is made of two main peaks. One is in Otsego County and the other, being the tallest at 1988 feet, in Delaware County.

References

Mountains of Otsego County, New York
Mountains of New York (state)
Mountains of Delaware County, New York